Kurt Swaim (born 1950) is the Iowa State Representative from the 94th District. He has served in the Iowa House of Representatives since 2003.

, Swaim serves on several committees in the Iowa House - the Agriculture, Commerce, and Public Safety committees.  He also serves as the ranking member of the Judiciary committee and as a member of the Child Support Advisory Committee.

Electoral history
*incumbent

References

External links

Representative Kurt Swaim official Iowa General Assembly site
Kurt Swaim State Representative official constituency site
 

Democratic Party members of the Iowa House of Representatives
Living people
People from Bloomfield, Iowa
1950 births
People from Davis County, Iowa